NZS may refer to:
Football Association of Slovenia
Independent Students Union (Poland)
New Zealand Standard and "joint Australian/New Zealand Standard" (AS/NZS) by Standards Australia and Standards New Zealand
New Zealand Steel
New Zealand Football, formerly New Zealand Soccer